Gretchen Garner (December 27, 1939 – February 15, 2017) was an American art historian, curator, writer, teacher, and self-taught photographer.

Biography

Education 
Garner was born in Minneapolis, Minnesota. She enrolled at the University of Chicago in 1965 and received her BA degree in Art History. After graduating, Garner spent a year studying photography on her own with her father’s 35mm camera. Between 1973–75, Garner studied photography at the School of Art institute in Chicago where she took her MFA.

Career 
While working as a photographer, photo editor, and instructor Garner raised two children in Chicago and Evanston, Illinois. Garner worked as a press photographer at the Chicago Daily News. Garner taught fine arts photography and history of photography at such universities as Grand Valley State College in Allendale, Michigan; Moore College of Art and Design in Philadelphia, and the University of Connecticut, where she also served as the Chair of the Art and Art History Department.

Later life and death 
During Garner's later life, she continued to write scholarly articles, exhibition catalogs and books. Her last book was Winold Reiss and the Cincinnati Union Terminal where Garner reawakens Reiss’ full-color images of the mosaic murals in the Cincinnati Union Terminal. In the 1980s, Garner was inspired by the countryside around Chicago and which inspired her to take up outdoor photography. She then travel around the USA and Europe for a decade. Some of the landscapes Garner portrayed included Denmark, Sweden and France. During the 1980s she also served as the Head, Department of Art at the University of Connecticut from 1989-1992 and served as a Professor there until 1994. From there, Garner transferred to Moore College of Art and Design to become an Academic Dean until 1997. Garner was an adjunct professor as well as visiting artist for The Ohio State University between 2003–2007. From 2007–2017 Garner resided back to her residence in Columbus, Ohio until she died at the age of 77.

Contributions and influence

Feminist art history 
Garner’s contribution to feminist art history is especially notable. Her exhibition Reclaiming Paradise: American Women Photograph the Land (1987) was widely popular, traveling to thirteen different location sites within two years. This catalog traces the lives of nineteenth-and twentieth-century women and their relationship with the landscape. Garner redressed the exclusion of women from the landscape canon throughout her writing. Her catalog for this exhibition became a primary source on women and modern American photography.

Contemporary landscape photography: "The New Metaphorics" 
In opposition to William Jenkins’s New Topographics gambit, Garner advocated for a “New Metaphorics.” Garner, along with photographer and critic Deborah Bright, critiqued the work of the New Topographics as having a macho undertone. Garner’s work showcased her own perspectives on documentary photography. The debate over documentary landscape photography remains an important component in contemporary landscape photography, but especially that of the 1970-80’s.

Publications 
Disappearing Witness: Change in Twentieth-Century American Photography. Johns Hopkins Press, 2003.

Winold Reiss and the Cincinnati Union Terminal Ohio University Press; 1 edition (August 30, 2016)
Six Ideas in Photography: A Celebration of Photography's Sesquicentennial, 1989.
Landscapes 1981-1988, 1989.
Reclaiming Paradise: American Women Photograph the Land, 1987.
An Art History of Ephemera: Gretchen Garner's Catalog, Photographs, 1976-1978.

Photographic work 
"Vanitas" 1980.
""Portfolio '74" 1974.
"Landscapes," 1990.
"Jamaica."

Exhibitions

References 

1939 births
2017 deaths
People from Minneapolis
University of Chicago alumni
American art historians
Women art historians
20th-century American writers
21st-century American writers
Moore College of Art and Design faculty
20th-century American photographers
American women writers
20th-century American women photographers
American women academics
21st-century American women artists